Hong Gil-dong (lit. Fast sword Hong Gil-dong) is a 2008 South Korean television series starring Kang Ji-hwan in the title role, Sung Yu-ri, Jang Keun-suk and Kim Ri-na. The drama is loosely based on Hong Gil-dong, a fictional book about a Robin Hood-like character during Korea's Joseon Dynasty, but with modern influences and comedic tones. It aired on KBS2 from January 2 to March 26, 2008 on Wednesdays and Thursdays at 21:55 for 24 episodes.

Synopsis
Hong Gil-dong is the illegitimate son of a minister. He is very bright and smart, however was told that he could not accomplish anything in this world, due to his illegitimate status. Thus he grew up spending most of his time being lazy and causing trouble for the people around him. However, a local monk thinks he is destined to be much more, and has taught Gil-dong martial arts. As the series progresses, Gil-dong realizes the severity of the injustices of the ranked world, and starts to fight against these injustices, stealing from the rich and giving to the poor.

Heo Yi-nok is an upbeat, naive and carefree girl. At the beginning of the series, she arrives from China with her grandfather, who has raised her. She meets and befriends Gil-dong. Yi-nok has a past she is unaware of: she does not know her grandfather is not her blood-related grandfather, and that her real parents were murdered. She eventually develops feelings for Gil-dong, who reciprocates her feelings.

Lee Chang-hwi also has arrived in Korea from China at the beginning of the series. He seems cold and calculating, as he also has a dark past in which his older brother, the current king of Joseon, tried to murder him. Chang-hwi is planning a revolution, in which he tries to overthrow the king and takes his place as, he believes, the rightful king of Joseon. He coincidentally bumps into both Gil-dong and Yi-nok. Both Gil-dong and Yi-nok help Chang-hwi realize what it takes to become a good king. He forges an alliance with Gil-dong and develops feelings for Yi-nok.

As the question of rightful succession comes into play, Gil-dong and Yi-nok are forced to take sides, all the while having to deal with their own personal problems: their love, Gil-dong with his father issues, Yi-nok with her murdered parents and their revenge.

Cast
 Kang Ji-hwan as Hong Gil-dong
 Lee In-sung as young Gil-dong
 Sung Yu-ri as Heo Yi-nok
 Jang Keun-suk as Lee Chang-hwi
 Choi Soo-han as young Chang-hwi
 Kim Ri-na as Seo Eun-hye
 Kim Jae-seung as Hong In-hyeong, Gil-dong's half-brother
 Cha Hyun-jung as Jung Mal-nyeo
 Park Sang-wook as Shim Soo-geun
 Choi Ran as Court lady Noh
 Kil Yong-woo as Minister Hong Pan-seo, Gil-dong's father
 Ahn Suk-hwan as Minister Seo Yoon-sub, Eun-hye's father
 Jung Eun-pyo as the monk Hye-myung, Gil-dong's master
 Jung Gyu-soo as the elder Heo
 Moon Se-yoon as Mr. Yeon
 In Sung as Chi-soo, Chang-hwi's personal guard
 Lee Deok-hee as Mrs. Kim
 Jo Hee-bong as King Gwanghae
 Maeng Ho-rim as Choi Seung-ji
 Kim Jong-seok as Eunuch Go
 Park Yong-jin as Eunuch Jang
 Choi Seung-kyung as Mr. Wang
 Byun Shin-ho as Hal Meom
 Maeng Se-chang as Gom
 Jang Ah-young as Shim Chung
 Choi Soo-ji as Queen Inmok, Chang-hwi's mother
 Heo In-young as Poong-san's wife

Ratings

Source: TNS Media Korea

Awards and nominations

International broadcast
In Thailand, the drama aired dubbed into Thai under the title ฮง กิลดอง จอมโจร โดนใจ (Hong Gil-dong Jomjone Donejai; literally Hong Gil-dong The Thief) on the Channel 7 from April 4, 2009 to June 13, 2009 on Saturdays and Sundays at 09:15.

See also
Hong Gildong (character)

References

External links
 Hong Gil-dong official KBS website 
 
 

Korean Broadcasting System television dramas
2008 South Korean television series debuts
2008 South Korean television series endings
Korean-language television shows
South Korean historical television series
South Korean action television series
Television shows written by the Hong sisters
Television series set in the Joseon dynasty
Works based on Hong Gildong jeon